The Aviomania G1SA Genesis Solo is a Cypriot autogyro that was designed by Nicolas Karaolides and produced by Aviomania of Larnaca. Now out of production, when it was available the aircraft was supplied as a complete ready-to-fly-aircraft or as a kit for amateur construction.

Design and development
The G1SA Genesis Solo features a single main rotor, a single-seat open cockpit with a windshield, tricycle landing gear with wheel pants, plus a tail caster and a twin cylinder, liquid-cooled, two-stroke, dual-ignition  Rotax 582 engine in pusher configuration. Other engine options included the  Rotax 912 UL.

The aircraft fuselage is made from bolted-together aluminum tubing and is equipped with a composite fairing.

Operational history
In a 2015 review, Werner Pfaendler wrote, "The Genesis G1sa Solo has been designed with stability and agility in mind. The centre line thrust and the design of the empennage in the propeller slipstream reduces all throttle reactions. The result is a fun machine which is very stable in flight while being very agile and maneuverable."

Specifications (G1SA Genesis Solo)

See also
List of rotorcraft

References

External links

Genesis Duo G2SA
2000s Cypriot sport aircraft
2000s Cypriot ultralight aircraft
2000s Cypriot civil utility aircraft
Homebuilt aircraft
Single-engined pusher autogyros